Delaware Technical Community College (previously  Delaware Technical & Community College, also known as DTCC, Delaware Tech, or Del Tech) is a public community college in the U.S. state of Delaware. Delaware Tech is an open admission institution accredited by the Middle States Commission on Higher Education. 

The college offers more than 100 associate degrees, diplomas, and certificate programs. Of these programs, 48 are accredited degree programs with articulation agreements with 61 other higher learning institutions. It is the only community college in the state.  The four-component campuses that make up the college are the Jack F. Owens Campus in Georgetown, Delaware, the Stanton Campus in Stanton, Delaware, the Charles L. Terry Campus in Dover, and the Orlando J. George, Jr. Campus in Wilmington, Delaware.

History

The Delaware General Assembly created Delaware Technical Community College in 1966 with the approval of House Bill 529, signed into law by then-Governor Charles L. Terry, Jr. The first Delaware Tech campus opened its doors in Sussex County in September 1967 with Dr. Paul K. Weatherly serving as the first president. Three hundred sixty-seven students enrolled in the first year. Enrolment doubled in the second year, and the construction of new laboratories and classrooms began. The Southern Campus was renamed in 1995 to the "Owens Campus" in honor of its first campus director, Jack F. Owens. In 1968, a Northern Campus was opened with 375 full-time students enrolled in the first year. A multi-campus facility was created, and the Stanton and Wilmington locations were opened in 1973 and 1974, respectively. With a Delaware Tech campus in both Sussex and New Castle Counties, it was determined that 47% of high school juniors and seniors in Kent County said they would be interested in a Kent County branch of Delaware Tech. In response to this need, Kent Campus was established in Dover in 1972, and the name was later changed to "Terry Campus" in honor of Governor Charles Terry, who was a motivating force behind the establishment of the College. The President's Office, located adjacent to the Terry Campus, functions as a central office by providing various services in support of the campuses.

Campuses

The college's campuses include:
 Charles L. Terry, Jr. Campus in Dover - It was named after Governor of Delaware Charles L. Terry. The  facility is on a  property, in northern Dover. The campus also has the Del-One conference center located inside 
 Owens Campus in Georgetown. It has  of land.
Stanton Campus in Stanton, an unincorporated area (Newark postal address)
 Stanton Gymnasium
 Orlando J. George, Jr. Campus - Wilmington
 Middletown Training Center

Athletics
The Delaware Tech Athletic Department operates under the guidance of the Dean of Student Services and follows all bylaws and regulations established by the National Junior College Athletic Association Region XIX. Students interested in athletic participation must meet NJCAA eligibility requirements.
 The Owens Campus hosts the softball and baseball team practices.  The baseball team won the 2001 NJCAA D2 World Series. Although the men's and women's cross country team practices at all campuses, home meets are typically held at the Owens campus, and the team wears blue uniforms.
 The Stanton campus hosts both men's and women's basketball team practices and women's volleyball team practices. The team colors are green and white.
 The Terry Campus hosts the men's lacrosse team practices.

Academics 

Delaware Technical Community College has "Connected Degree" agreements and programs with other higher education institutions in the state. Individuals may earn an associate's degree at Del Tech and then transfer previously earned credits to other Delaware institutions at a possibly lower cost to the student. Of the more than 200 connected degree agreements, most are with are with the University of Delaware, Delaware State University, and Wilmington University.

In the 2019–2020 school year, 14,029 students were enrolled in Delaware Tech. The gender ratio for that year is ~0.65 female and ~0.35 male. Students out-of-state can be expected to take classes at 2.5 times the cost as in-state students. Although a more expensive option for out of state residents, in-state students are eligible to apply for the Delaware SEED Scholarship, which is intended to reduce the burden on the student to just books and course fees.

In 1987 the Delaware Tech established the Academic Challenge Program. It included University of Delaware until 2016 though existing University of Delaware students remained.

Notable former faculty
 Dr. Jill Biden – English instructor, current First Lady of the United States

Notable alumni

 James Hutchison – Mayor of Dover, Delaware (1994–2004)
 Harvey Kenton – Delaware State Representative (2011–2019)
 Ruth Ann Minner – Governor of Delaware (2001–2009)
 Trinidad Navarro – Insurance Commissioner of Delaware
 Montrell Teague – Harness racing driver
 Dennis P. Williams – Mayor of Wilmington, Delaware (2013–2017)

See also
Del Tech Stanton Gymnasium

References

External links

Garden State Athletic Conference
Community colleges in Delaware
Buildings and structures in Wilmington, Delaware
Educational institutions established in 1966
Education in New Castle County, Delaware
1966 establishments in Delaware
NJCAA athletics